The 2002–03 season of the Slovak Second Football League (also known as 2. liga) was the tenth season of the league since its establishment. It began on 20 July 2002 and ended on 5 June 2003.

League standing

See also
2002–03 Slovak Superliga

External links
 Tables and results at www.liga.cz

2. Liga (Slovakia) seasons
2002–03 in Slovak football
Slovak